Think: Philosophy for Everyone is an academic journal created to forge a direct link between contemporary philosophy and the general public. The central aim of the journal is to provide easily accessible and engaging writing by philosophers pre-eminent in their fields to a wide audience, unimpeded by academic jargon and technicality. The journal is sponsored by the Royal Institute of Philosophy in London and published by Cambridge University Press. Think's editor is Stephen Law.

Think expressly aims to counter the popular impression that philosophy is pointless and wholly detached from everyday life. It also aims to expose some of the bad philosophy that currently passes as accepted wisdom, and offers contemporary philosophers the chance to help nurture and encourage philosophers of the next generation.

Most cited articles 
 "Achievements, luck and value", Duncan Pritchard
 "Why we need friendly AI", Luke Muehlhauser and Nick Bostrom
 "Creativity in a nutshell", Margaret A. Boden
 "Neuroreductionism about sex and love", Julian Savulescu and Brian D. Earp
 "Why open-mindedness matters", William Hare
 "Should philosophers ‘apply ethics’?", Gerald Gaus

Notable articles 
Notable articles include:
 Antony Flew, ‘My “Conversion”’
 Brad Hooker, ‘The Golden Rule’
 Fred Dretske, ‘Mental Causation’
 Nigel Warburton, ‘The Gambler’s Argument’
 Jenny Teichman, ‘Darwin, Malthus and Professor Jones’
 Richard Dawkins, ‘Richard Swinburne’s Is There a God? ’
 Mary Midgley, ‘How Real Are You?’
 Simon Blackburn, ‘Relatively Speaking’
 Mary Warnock, ‘Genetic Engineering and What is Natural’

See also 
Café Philosophique
Philosophy For All
Philosophy Now
Pub Philosophy
Society for Philosophical Inquiry
Socrates Cafe

References

External links
Journal Homepage

Philosophy journals
Publications established in 2002
Cambridge University Press academic journals
2002 establishments in England
Academic journals associated with learned and professional societies
Triannual journals
Philosophy education
Public philosophy
English-language journals